Howard Rothmann Bowen (October 27, 1908 – December 22, 1989) was an American economist and college president, serving as the president of Grinnell College from 1955 to 1964 and as the fourteenth President of the University of Iowa from 1964 to 1969. Bowen then served as president of Claremont Graduate University from 1970 to 1971. He is remembered for the formulation of "Bowen's law," a description of spending in higher education.

Biography

Early life and education
Bowen was born in Spokane, Washington. He earned his Bachelor of Arts degree in 1929 and Master of Arts degree in 1933 from Washington State University. He did his doctoral studies at the University of Iowa and received his Ph.D. in 1935, then went on to do postdoctoral study at the University of Cambridge, England, and the London School of Economics from 1937 to 1938.

Marriage and children
He married Lois B. Schilling of Green Bay, Wisconsin, in 1935. The couple had two sons.

Career
Howard Bowen's career began at the University of Iowa.  He taught economics at the university from 1935 to 1942, then decided to make a career change. He was chief economist of the Joint Congressional Committee on Internal Revenue Taxation from 1944 to 1945 and economist for the Irving Trust Company, a Wall Street bank, from 1945 to 1947.

After serving the government for a few years, Bowen decided to return to education.  His first job back into education was at the University of Illinois.  At Illinois he was appointed dean of the College of Commerce in 1947.  Howard Bowen’s tenure at Illinois was a good one with improvements in many different programs.  In 1950, Bowen had to resign from the University of Illinois because senior professionals did not like his curriculum on the social responsibility of businessmen and, as an example of McCarthyism, accused him of being anti-business.

Howard Bowen loved higher education so much that, despite his problems at the University of Illinois, he decided to teach economics at Williams College in Massachusetts.  Bowen loved this job but enjoyed administration more, so he then went to Grinnell College in Iowa.  While serving as Grinnell president, he increased enrollment, quality of students and faculty, and endowment to national stature.  After making such great improvements at Grinnell the State University of Iowa wanted him to work for them.  The State University of Iowa hired Bowen in 1964 to be president of the college.  Howard Bowen made a great accomplishment by going to the legislature in Iowa and convincing them to change the university's name to the University of Iowa. He was president there during student uprisings and anti-war demonstrations in the late 1960s.

Bowen's Law

The last job Howard Bowen ever took was as the R. Stanton Avery Professor of Economics and Education at Claremont Graduate University. Bowen also served as CGU president for one year. During his tenure from 1974 to 1984 Bowen published three important writings:  Investment in Learning, Costs of Higher Education, and American Professors:  A National Resource Imperiled.

Costs of Higher Education is best known for Bowen's Revenue Theory of Costs, sometimes called Bowen's Law:
...at any given time, the unit cost of education is determined by the amount of revenues currently available for education relative to enrollment. The statement is more than a tautology, as it expresses the fundamental fact that unit cost [i.e., the cost of education] is determined by hard dollars of revenue and only indirectly and distantly by considerations of need, technology, efficiency, and market wages and prices. (p. 19)

Bowen's book provided plentiful evidence that higher education institutions of similar size, situation and repute had radically different costs per student, and spent each dollar differently from one another.  Their different costs were a function of their different histories in raising money.

Death and afterward
Howard Bowen died on December 22, 1989. The Association for the Study of Higher Education has given an award in his name, the Howard R. Bowen Distinguished Career Award, annually since 1991. There are annual Howard Bowen Lectures at the Tippie College of Business and Claremont Graduate University. The Bowen Science Building at the University of Iowa is named after him.

Published works
Toward Social Economy (1948)
Social Responsibilities of the Businessman (1953)
The Business Enterprise as a Subject for Research (1955)
Automation and Economic Progress (1966)
Technology and Employment (1966)
The Finance of Higher Education (1968)
Efficiency in Liberal Education (1971)
Who Benefits from Higher Education--and Who Should Pay? (1972)
Evaluating Institutions for Accountability (1974)
Investment in Learning (1977)
The Costs of Higher Education (1980)
The State of the Nation and the Agenda for Higher Education (1982)
American Professors: A National Resource Imperiled (1986)
Academic Recollections (1988)

Awards
1965: Regents' Distinguished Alumnus Award, Washington State University
1983: Frederic W. Ness Book Award, Association of American Colleges and Universities (for The State of the Nation and the Agenda for Higher Education)
1985: Distinguished Service to Education Award, Council for Advancement and Support of Education

References

External links

Howard Bowen Encyclopedia of Education 2002 Retrieved October 22, 2007
 The Howard Bowen Papers are housed at the University of Iowa Special Collections & University Archives.

1908 births
1989 deaths
Employees of the United States Congress
Writers from Spokane, Washington
Presidents of the University of Iowa
University of Iowa alumni
Washington State University alumni
Williams College faculty
Presidents of Grinnell College
20th-century American economists
Economists from Washington (state)
American academic administrators
Presidents of the American Finance Association
20th-century American academics